Graziella Franchini (5 January 1950 – 27 April 1986), better known as Lolita, was an Italian pop singer.

Life and career 
Born in Castagnaro, Verona, in 1950. She first became known in 1969, thanks to her participation to the Festival di Napoli, where she was finalist with two songs, and to the RAI musical show Settevoci, where she launched her hit "Come le rose".

In the following years Lolita took part in some of the most important musical events in Italy, including Un disco per l'estate and the 23rd edition of the Sanremo Music Festival.

With her career declining in the second half of the 1980s she moved to Lamezia Terme, where she continued to perform in live events achieving some local success. The night of April 27, 1986 she had to attend a musical event but did not show up; she was found dead the following morning, murdered by stabbing, and with her body disfigured in several parts. The crime remains unsolved.

See also
List of unsolved murders

Discography

Singles  
     1966: Matusalemme/La prima barba (Magic, MC 004)
     1967: La mia vita non ha domani/Notte giovane (Magic, MC 006)
     1968: Come le rose/W l'estate (Escalation, En 001)
     1969: L'ultimo ballo d'estate/Pensiero (CAR Juke Box, CRJ NP 1048)
     1969: Tu/Songo 'e nato (CAR Juke Box, CRJ NP 1051)
     1969: L'onda verde/Giovedì venerdì (CAR Juke Box, CRJ NP 1059)
     1970: Circolo chiuso/Malinconia malinconia (Shoking, SKLR 10 001)
     1970: Dicitencello vuje/Notte chiara (Philips, 6025 016)
     1971: Io sto soffrendo/Il primo amore (Shoking, SKLR 10 002)
     1973: Innamorata io?/Situazione (CAR Juke Box, CRJ NP 1087)
     1984: Sei la felicità/Amico mio (Idea Records, LR 76001)

References

External links 
 

1950 births
1986 deaths
20th-century Italian women singers
Female murder victims
Deaths by stabbing in Italy
Italian pop singers
Italian murder victims
1986 murders in Italy
People from the Province of Verona
People murdered in Calabria
Unsolved murders in Italy